Lia is a village in Sør-Fron Municipality in Innlandet county, Norway.

References

Sør-Fron
Villages in Innlandet
Populated places on the Gudbrandsdalslågen